Ukrainian music covers diverse and multiple component elements of the music that is found in the Western and Eastern musical civilization. It also has a very strong indigenous Slavic and Christian uniqueness whose elements were used among the areas that surround modern Ukraine.

Ukraine is also the rarely acknowledged musical heartland of the former Russian Empire, home to its first professional music academy, which opened in the mid-18th century and produced numerous early musicians and composers.

Modern Ukraine is situated north of the Black Sea, previously part of the Soviet Union. Several of its ethnic groups living within Ukraine have their own unique musical traditions and some have developed specific musical traditions in association with the land in which they live.

Folk music 

Ukraine found itself at the crossroads of Asia and Europe and this is reflected within the music in a perplexing mix of exotic melismatic singing with chordal harmony which does not always easily fit the rules of traditional Western European harmony.
The most striking general characteristic of authentic ethnic Ukrainian folk music is the wide use of minor modes or keys which incorporate augmented 2nd intervals. This is an indication that the major-minor system developed in Western European music did not become as entrenched in Ukraine.

Rhythmically the music rarely uses complex time-signatures, but compound meters are encountered, and the music can be extremely complex harmonically.

Harmonically three and even four part harmony had developed and was recorded in the central steppe regions of Ukraine, but was not in popular use in the mountain regions by the late 19th century.

Ritual songs show the greatest tendency to preservation. They are frequently in recitative style, essentially monodic, based on notes in the range of a third or a fourth. An example of this style is the theme for the Shchedrivka "Shchedryk" known in the West as "Carol of the Bells".
A large group of Ukrainian ritual melodies fall within a perfect fourth with the main central tone as the lowest note. Many of the ritual Easter melodies known as Hayivky fall into this category. The tetrachordal system is also found in wedding and harvest songs. Folk dances often have melodies based on two tetrachords fused together.
The pentatonic scale in anhemitonic form is common in spring songs known as Vesnianky.
The bulk of Ukrainian folk songs melodies are based on scales identical to mеdieval modes, but differ in melodic structure. The Mixolydian and Dorian modes are used more often than Ionian and Aeolian modes. This is a feature of traditional paraliturgical Koliadky.
The augmented 2nd interval is found, as well as the raising of the fourth and seventh degree of the scale. It is often used for melodic expression. This melodic manner gives an effect that is described as adding severe tension or sadness in some Ukrainian songs. The phenomenon is not found in Russian folk songs and is thought to have been introduced or developed in the 17th century.

Vocal 

Ukrainian folk song singing style can be divided into a number of broad aesthetic categories.

1. Solo singing – primarily ritual songs including holosinnya sung at wakes.

2. Solo singing with instrumental accompaniment by professional itinerant singers known as kobzari or lirnyky. The highest form of development of this style of singing can be seen in the lyric historical folk epics known as dumy sung to the accompaniment of the bandura, kobza or lira (lirnyk). Dumy were sung primarily in the dorian mode

3. The third is an archaic type of modal "a cappella" vocal style in which a phrase sung by a soloist is answered by a choral phrase in 2- or 3- voice vertical polyphony/heterophony/harmony. The vocal inflection here is quite mediaeval in character, and some peculiarities of distinctly Ukrainian flavor are noticeable, such as parallel fifths and octaves, and several types of plagal cadences. This type of song, once dominant, after 1650 has ceded its hegemony to the newer tonal types, but can still be found in isolated villages. This style is evident in the "Kolyadka" and "Shchedryk".

4. The other vocal styles are marked by the influences exerted by European music, by paraliturgical music of Danylo Tuptalo and his circle in the early 18th century, and later by classical music and urban culture.

Ukrainian vocal music exhibits a wide variety of forms – monodic, heterophonic, homophonic, harmonic and polyphonic.

One of the most active proponents of Ukrainian vocal music is Nina Matviyenko, along with recently established groups dedicated to the preservation of traditional polyphony such as  "Bozhychi", "Hurtopravci", "Volodar", "Korali" and "Drevo". Popular folk songs include:

"Ikhav Kozak za Dunaj"
"Pidmanula Pidvela"
"Nich Yaka Misyachna"
"Shchedryk" – originally an ancient folk chant arranged by Mykola Leontovych
Zaporozhets za Dunayem – comic opera based on popular folk song
"Oi ne khody, Hrytsiu" – by popular folk artist Marusia Churai
"Rospryagayte Chloptzi Koney" – originally Ukrainian folk song

Instrumental 

Common traditional instruments include: the kobza (lute), bandura, torban (bass lute), violin, basolya (3-string cello), the relya or lira (hurdy-gurdy) and the tsymbaly; the sopilka (duct flute), floyara (open, end-blown flute), trembita (alpenhorn), fife, volynka (bagpipes); and the buben (frame drum), tulumbas (kettledrum), resheto (tambourine) and drymba/varhan (Jaw harp). Traditional instrumental ensembles are often known as troïstï muzyki (literally ‘three musicians’ that typically make up the ensemble, e.g. violin, sopilka and buben). When performing dance melodies instrumental performance usually includes improvisation.

The traditional dances of Ukraine include: the Kozak, Kozachok, Tropak, Hopak, Hrechanyky, Kolomyjka and Hutsulka, Metelytsia, Shumka, Arkan, Kateryna (Kadryl) and Chabarashka. Dances originating outside the Ukrainian ethnic region but which are also popular include: the Polka, Mazurka, Krakowiak, Csárdás, Waltz, Kamarinskaya and Barynya. Ukrainian instrumental and dance music has also influenced Jewish (Hava Nagila-Let's rejoyce) and Gypsy music and much of it was included in the repertoire of itinerant klezmorim.

Early in the 20th century, Pavlo Humeniuk of Philadelphia became famous in North America for his fiddle music.

Vocal-instrumental folk music and performers 

Although most instrumental dance music in Ukraine can be sung to, there exist in Ukraine a group of professional folk musicians who sing to their own accompaniment. These itinerant musicians were generically called kobzari (kobzar – singular), and accompanied their singing with the kobza, bandura, or lira. Although their origins stretch back to antiquity, their repertoire and customs directly date back to the 17th century in which they depict the period of the conflicts between the Kozaks and various foreign oppressors. There were many cases of those folk singers being blind which became a stereotype in the cultural memory.

Kobzari 
The kobzari organized themselves into regional professional guild-like structures, known as a "Kobzar Guild".

During Soviet era almost all of the traditional kobzari were killed, the bulk perishing during Stalin's "purges" during the 1930s. Even the instrument, kobza and bandura, were prohibited and confiscated. A practice of the Ukrainian ethnocide that continued after the fall of the Russian Empire.

Under the inspiration of noted traditional bandurist Heorhiy Tkachenko a Kobzar Guild was re-established in 1991 in Kyiv by Mykola Budnyk in order to revive and foster the ancient kobzar traditions. The Guild unites many singer-musicians in Ukraine and the Ukrainian diaspora. Many of its members are not formally Conservatory trained.

Soviet-inspired folk music 
With the establishment of the Soviet regime in Ukraine a policy based on state atheism was instituted which gradually grew to an intolerance to organized religion. Religious music was not supported by the regime and in time was purged from performance. Many aspects of classical music were also branded as being bourgeois and decadent.

A movement was started in the 20s for "Proletarian songs" – music of the working people. In time it was noticed that this music only catered for the working classes in the cities and did not take into account the large percentage of Ukrainian peasants living in village setting. As a consequence, songs of the village were also defined as being also from the working class. Resulting from this reclassification the Soviet government began to give significant support to this form of music. Hence, various "fakeloric" ensembles came into existence. After World War II huge resources continued to be given to support this style of music in order to displace the onslaught of mass culture from the West.

Numerous folk choirs were established such as the Veriovka folk choir directed by Hryhoriy Veriovka. A stylized dance troupe was established by Pavlo Virsky based on a synthesis of ethnographic dance and ballet. Particularly popular were the numerous Bandurist Capellas. These particular pseudo-folk forms blending ethnographic materials in an art setting have also become popular in the Ukrainian diaspora in North America.

Bandura 
In North America pseudo-folk or "reconstructive" bandurists such as Zinoviy Shtokalko, Hryhoriy Kytasty, Julian Kytasty, Victor Mishalow, et al. have played a significant role in defining Ukrainian ethnicity in the New World, while fusing traditional musical material with new possibilities offered by contemporary instruments.

Music of non-Ukrainian ethnic minorities 
Of the traditional musics of non-Ukrainian ethnic minorities living in Ukraine possibly the richest and most developed is that of Jewish music (including Klezmer, cantorial, Yiddish-language folksongs, and Yiddish theatre music) which can trace most of its origins to the Jewish Pale of Settlement and to South-western Ukraine. It is estimated that one third of the total Jewish population of Europe lived on Ukrainian ethnic territory at the turn of the 19th century. Therefore a number of Soviet and Russian Empire Jewish folklorists collected and documented Jewish music primarily in Ukraine, including S. Ansky, Susman Kiselgof, Moisei Beregovsky, Joel Engel, and Sofia Magid. Many of these collected works are now in the possession of the Vernadsky National Library of Ukraine.

Russian music has also had a strong base for development in Ukraine. Many of the early performers on Russian folk instruments came from Ukraine and these performers often included Ukrainian melodies in their repertoire. The 4 string Russian domra continues to be used and taught in Ukraine despite the fact that it has been replaced by the 3 string domra in Russia proper.

Ukrainized versions and borrowed music 
 Polonaise
 The Hills of Manchuria

Classical music 
 
Composers of Ukrainian ethnicity that lived in Ukraine during the 19th century are associated with the a national school of music that was influenced by Ukrainian folk tunes and texts. Non-Ukrainian composers who lived in territories that now form part of modern Ukraine, such as Franz Xavier Mozart, Isaak Dunayevsky, Rheinhold Gliere, and Sergei Prokofiev, rarely composed music that influenced in this way. Ukrainian-born composers who lived abroad, such as Dmytro Bortniansky, Maksym Berezovsky, Artemy Vedel, Dimitry of Rostov, Mykola Fomenko, Yuriy Oliynyk, Zinoviy Lawryshyn, Wasyl Sydorenko, Mykola Roslavets and Dunayevsky, have had an influence upon Ukrainian classical music.

Baroque music 
During the Baroque period, music was an important discipline for those that had received a higher education in Ukraine. It had a place of considerable importance in the curriculum of the Kyiv-Mohyla Academy. Much of the nobility was well versed in music with many Ukrainian Cossack leaders such as (Mazepa, Paliy, Holovatyj, Sirko) being accomplished players of the kobza, bandura, or torban.

In the course of the 18th century in the Russian Empire, court musicians were typically trained at the music academy in Hlukhiv and largely came from Ukraine. Notable performers of the era include Tymofiy Bilohradsky, who later studied the lute under Sylvius Leopold Weiss in Dresden; his daughter Yelyzaveta, who was a famous operatic soprano; and Oleksiy Rozumovsky, a court bandurist and the morganatic husband of Empress Elizabeth.

The first professional music academy of the Russian Empire was established in Ukraine in Hlukhiv in 1738, the Hlukhiv Music Academy, where students were taught to sing and play violin and bandura from manuscripts. As a result, many of the earliest composers and performers of the Russian empire were ethnically Ukrainian, having been born or educated in Hlukhiv or having been closely associated with this music school.

Ukrainian nationalist movement in music 

During the 19th century, musical nationalism arose in Europe, characterized by an emphasis on national musical elements, and associated with the growth of national consciousness of European peoples. A Ukrainian nationalist movement in music appeared during the late 19th century. Ukrainian writers, poets, and professional musicians used folklore to arrange folk songs. The opening of the first professional theatres in Kyiv (1803) and Odesa (1810), which staged works on national themes, played an important role in the formation of Ukrainian opera. the first of which was Zaporozhets za Dunayem by Semen Hulak-Artemovsky (1863).

A key figure in the development of Ukrainian nationalist music during the 19th century was the composer, conductor and pianist Mykola Lysenko, whose compositions include nine operas, and music for piano. He used Ukrainian poetry, including that of the poet Taras Shevchenko. In 1904, Lysenko opened the Russian empire's first Ukrainian music school in Kiev (now the ). He is credited with establishing a classical music tradition that was a blend of folk music and classical music forms.

Lysenko's work was continued by other composers, including Mykola Leontovych, Kyrylo Stetsenko, Yakiv Stepovy, and Stanyslav Lyudkevych.

Musical culture in the Ukrainian State (1918) 
In the period of the Liberation War numerous Ukrainian artistic groups were created. The Government of the Ukrainian State has taken a consistent position in the field of cultural development, including music, as evidenced by the Resolution of the Council of Ministers on the mobilization of literary, scientific, artistic and technical forces of Ukraine. In particular, by the decree of Pavel Skoropadsky in 1918, the State Symphony Orchestra of Ukraine, the Ukrainian State Chapel, the First and Second National Choirs were established. The Kyiv opera was named the Ukrainian Drama and Opera Theater, and a significant number of world-famous operas have been translated into Ukrainian.  Also in 1918, the Kobzar Choir was founded, which would later be revived as the State Bandura Chapel.

Soviet Romantic school 
The arrival of Soviet authorities in Ukraine was marked by a number of tragic events. In 1921, Leontovych was killed by an agent of the Cheka, and in 1928 the society in his memory were banned. Ukrainian art suffered the worst losses in the 1930s, during which the Soviet authorities exterminated several hundred bandura players, kobzars, and lyre players, and in 1938, musician and ethnographer Hnat Khotkevych was shot among other artists of the "shot revival."

At the same time, the Soviet authorities opened a number of music institutions in various cities of Ukraine. In particular, these are opera and ballet theaters in Kharkiv (1925), Poltava (1928), Vinnytsia (1929), Dnipropetrovsk (1931), Donetsk (1941), choral and symphonic groups were organized. According to the Resolution of the Central Committee of the Communist Party "On the Restructuring of Literary and Artistic Organizations" in 1932, The Union of Soviet Musicians of Ukraine (later - "Union of Composers") was organized and entrusted with the functions of ideological control over compositions by Ukrainian composers.

Among Ukrainian composers of the Soviet period were Gliere, Borys Lyatoshynsky, Lev Revutsky, Mykola Vilinsky, Anatoliy Kos-Anatolsky, Andriy Shtoharenko, Mykola Dremliuha, Vitaly Kyreyko.

Soviet modernist school 
The 1960s are marked by the breakthrough of the Ukrainian school of composition on the world stage, the mastery of the latest trends in European musical culture. A group of Kyiv Avant-Garde artists is being formed in Kyiv, which includes composers such as Valentyn Silvestrov, Leonid Grabovsky, Vitaliy Godziatsky, and Volodymyr Guba. The central figure in this group was the conductor Igor Blazhkov. As a result of differences with the retrograde tendencies of the official musical circles of the USSR, the members of the "Kyiv avant-garde" were subjected to various kinds of oppression.

In the 1970s and 1980s, composers became famous who expanded the traditional late Romantic style for Ukrainian music through the latest techniques of European modernism - Myroslav Skoryk, Yevhen Stankovych, Ivan Karabyts, Lev Kolodub, and others. Among composers of Ukrainian diaspora - Virko Baley.

Post-independence 
After Ukraine gained independence, any ideological barriers were removed and composers got an opportunity to experiment with different styles and genres. Festivals of avant-gard music such as Kyiv Music Fest, Kontrasty, Two Days and Two Nights of New Music were established. Among composers of new generation - Oleksandr Kozarenko, Volodymyr Runchak, Hanna Havrylets', Ivan Nebesnyy. In 2000s experimental electronic music in Ukraine began to develop, the leader of this trend is Alla Zahaikevych.

There are also musicians and ensambles that are difficult to categorize, such as
 Mariana Sadovska – avantgarde and folk singer and composer
 Roman Turovsky – historicist lutenist-composer
 Dakha Brakha
 Dakh Daughters
 New Era Orchestra - a classical music orchestra that also plays contemporary music

There are also musicians in Ukraine (Kostyantyn Chechenya, Vadym Borysenko) and in diaspora (Volodymyr Smishkevych, Julian Kytasty, Roman Turovsky) who have been preserving Ukrainian music of the Medieval, Renaissance and Baroque Eras.

Pop music 
Pop music in Ukraine is Western influenced pop music in its various forms that has been growing in popularity in Ukraine since the 1960s. The 1970s saw the emergence of a number of folk rock groups such as Kobza. Major contributions were made by songwriter Volodymyr Ivasyuk, Oleksandr Bilash. After Ivasyuk's death in 1979, developments in Ukrainian pop music almost ground to a halt. Even established folk-rock groups such as Kobza began to sing in Russian.

The revival of Ukrainian pop music emerged in 1990s after Ukraine gained an independence. The Chervona Ruta Festival played an important role in popularisation and evolution of the modern Ukrainian song. In 2004 Ruslana was a first Ukrainian singer who won the Eurovision Song Contest.

Until the Russo-Ukrainian War broke out in 2014, the Russian language was widely used by Ukrainian artists in order to also reach audiences outside Ukraine who could understand Russian. Russian-language songs gradually lost popularity in Ukraine after 2014, while Ukrainian-language music experienced a surge; this trend accelerated when the 2022 Russian invasion of Ukraine began in February 2022. Muzvar music journalist Julian Novak stated in July 2022: 'Many popular artists have decided to switch to the Ukrainian language, and change their existing Russian-language repertoire to Ukrainian.' The war became an increasingly prominent theme in songs, with lyrics about consolation in trying times of losing loved ones and having to flee one's home and country, but also the courage to go on. New musical tracks from Ukraine also incorporated ever more elements of Ukrainian folklore, such as the remake of a traditional lullaby by Eurovision Song Contest 2022 winner "Stefania", and the use of the traditional flute.

Other musicians and composers

Ukrainian

 Semen Hulak-Artemovsky. 1813–1873. Opera composer, singer (baritone), actor, and dramatist, whose best known work is the comic opera  Zaporozhets za Dunayem
 Mykola Leontovych. 1877–1921. Composer. Best known worldwide for his arrangement of Shchedryk, which became known in North America as "Carol of the Bells."
 Levko Revutsky. 1889–1977. Composer, teacher, and activist. Known for introducing Ukrainian music motives combined with western composing style.
 Dmytro Bortniansky . 1751–1825. Ukrainian liturgical composer. Born Hlukhiv, Ukraine.
 Reinhold Gliere. 1875–1956. Composer. Born in Kyiv.
 Mykola Vilinsky. 1888–1956. Ukrainian classical composer and teaching professor.
 Oleksandr Bilash. Ukrainian classical and popular song composer. His best known song is Dva Kolery (Two Colors).
 Myroslav Skoryk. Ukrainian classical composer.
 Volodymyr Ivasiuk. 1949–1979. Ukrainian popular song composer. His best known song is Chervona Ruta.
 Valentin Silvestrov modern Ukrainian "minimalistic music" composer. His best known work is "Quiet songs" for bariton voice.
 Julia Gomelskaya 1964– Ukrainian contemporary composer of symphony, chamber, choir and vocal music.
 Svitlana Azarova 1976– Ukrainian composer of contemporary classical music
 Aleksandr Shymko
 Roman Miroshnichenko 1977– jazz-fusion guitarist, composer, producer. Independent Music Awards winner.
 Virko Baley Composer. Conductor of Las Vegas Symphony.
 Dmitri Tiomkin 1899–1979. Born Poltava, Ukraine. American film composer (Academy Award for score of movie High Noon, also best song from that movie "Do Not Forsake Me, Oh My Darling"). A U.S.A. postage stamp was issued in his honor.
 Gary Kulesha, Ukrainian-Canadian composer.
 Victor Mishalow
 Alexis Kochan
 Julian Kytasty
 Roman Turovsky
 Darka and Slavko
 DakhaBrakha
 Karol Szymanowski, Polish composer, born in Ukraine.

Other composers 
Stepan Rak, b. 1945, Prolific Czech composer and guitarist. "... identifies the village Chust in Ukraine as the place where the newborn infant, who was later christened as Stepan Rak, was found by Soviet soldiers in a bomb-wrecked house."
Ludwig van Beethoven – Razumovsky Quartets, Opus 59 No. 1-3, Air de la Petite Russe,
Antonín Dvořák – Piano Trio No. 4 has the subtitle Dumky.
Alexander Glazunov – Hopak
Reinhold Gliere – Ballet "Taras Bulba" based on Gogol's Novella 
Mikhail Glinka – romances "Don't chirp the nightingale" ("Не щебечи соловейку") and "The wind is blowing loudly in the field" ("Гуде вітер вельми в полі"), both on Ukrainian lyrics by V. Zabila.   
Joseph Haydn – String quartet no. 20. opus 9 no. 2
Johann Nepomuk Hummel –  Trio op. 78 in A major
Vanessa Lann – Two Ukrainian Folk Sketches for B-flat clarinet and piano

Compositions with a Ukrainian connection

Carl Maria von Weber –  Nine Variations on "Schöne Minka", op. 40 (1815), his longest set of variations.
Franz Liszt - Mazeppa (first performed in 1854). Liszt's sixth symphonic poem, Ballade d'Ukraine, is based on the poem of the same title written by Victor Hugo. Mazeppa is a Ukrainian nobleman who became a page at the court of John II Casimir Vasa, King of Poland. As punishment for having a love affair with the wife of a Podolian count, Mazeppa is tied naked onto a wild horse that heads toward Ukraine. The horse collapses and dies, and Mazeppa is saved by Ukrainian Cossacks, who then name him as their leader. Led by Mazeppa, the Ukrainians are victorious in battle.

Alexander Dargomyzhsky – "Kozachok" ("Cossack"), one of three orchestral works composed. Written in 1864, it was based on the Kozachok, a traditional Ukrainian dance.
Piotr Tchaikovsky – Symphony No. 2 in C minor, composed in 1872 and named the "Little Russian" (Russian: Малороссийская, Malorossiyskaya) because of Tchaikovsky's use of Ukrainian folk themes. His opera Mazepa was based on a poem by Alexander Pushkin, which was set in Ukraine. The main theme of the first movement of the Piano Concerto No. 1 is based on a popular Ukrainian folk song that was traditionally performed by wandering Lirnyky, although without the original character of the tune.
Modest Mussorgsky – The Fair at Sorochyntsi (opera, unfinished at the time of Mussorgsky's death in 1881). The opera is based on Nikolai Gogol's short story of the same name, from his early (1832) collection of Ukrainian stories Evenings on a Farm near Dikanka. It is set in Velyki Sorochyntsi, in Ukraine. In Act 1, Cherevik and his friend sing a song based on an old Ukrainian folk tune.
Sergei Rachmaninoff – the opening of the Piano Concerto No 3 (1909) is based on an Orthodox church chant, although Rachmaninoff denied he was specifically influenced by anything.
Quincy Porter – Ukrainian Suite (1925) for string orchestra. A meticulously constructed and melodic piece based on a number of Ukrainian folk tunes, the Suite was written before Porter developed his mature style.
Sergei Prokofieff – wrote a five-act opera Semyon Kotko (1939). The opera is set in Ukraine in 1918.
Dmitri Kabalevsky –  A Ukrainian folk tune is incorporated into the first movement of Kabalevsky's Violin Concerto in C major (1948). which was "composed with young virtuosi in mind".

Scholarship
The Polyphony Project, which is funded in part by the Creative Europe program of the European Union, and which aims to "explore, preserve and present the living musical folklore of Ukrainian villages", has an online archive of Ukrainian folk music.

See also
 Torban
 Kobza
 Bandura
 Preservation of kobzar music
 Ensemble Nostri Temporis
 Zaporizhian March
 Trembita

References

Sources

Further reading

External links 
Polyphony Project 
 Folk Songs of Ukraine
 Public Domain scores of Ukrainian music on-line:
 Ukrainian songs
 Lemko songs
 Samples and Pictures of Ukrainian Instruments
 Ukrainian baroque songs. Audio files
 Ukrainian art songs. Audio files
 Ukrainian tango songs. Audio files
 Ukrainian Rhapsody – A journey into Ukrainian classical music with notes by Natalya Pasichnyk, from YouTube